Metamorphic can mean:

Computing
Metamorphic code, a programming technique used to disguise code in computer viruses
Metamorphic testing, a software testing technique

Science
Metamorphic rock, rocks that have been transformed by extreme heat and pressure
Metamorphic core complex, exposures of deep crust exhumed in association with largely amagmatic extension
Metamorphic reaction, a chemical reaction that takes place during the geological process of metamorphism
Metamorphic facies,  a set of metamorphic mineral assemblages that are formed under similar pressures and temperatures
Metamorphic zone, an area where, as a result of metamorphism, the same combination of minerals occurs in the bed rocks

Other uses
Metamorphic library steps, a piece of 18th century folding furniture
 Metamorphic Ventures, a New York-based venture capital firm
Metamorphic Force, an arcade game released by Konami in August 1993